Live at the Beacon Theatre may refer to:

Live at the Beacon Theatre (James Taylor video album)
Live at the Beacon Theatre (The Allman Brothers Band DVD)

See also
Live at the Beacon Theater, comedy special by Louis C.K.